Dr. Helga Jace is a fictional character in the DC Comics Universe. She is a supporting character of the Outsiders and was the scientist responsible for giving Princess Tara/Terra and her elder brother Prince Brion/Geo-Force their earth-controlling powers. 

The character was portrayed by Jennifer Riker in the live-action Arrowverse television series Black Lightning in the second and third seasons.

Publication history
Created by Mike W. Barr and Jim Aparo, Helga Jace first appeared in Batman and the Outsiders #1 (1983). She was apparent supporting of the Outsiders.

In the Millennium storyline 1988, Helga Jace was revealed to be a villain and had own agenda; the story was written by Steve Englehart.

Fictional character biography
Dr. Helga Jace was a scientist and geneticist from Markovia who worked directly for the Royal Family. After the death of King Viktor, a revolutionary movement broke out. She used her scientific ability to activate Prince Brion Markov and Princess Terra's Meta-genes to give them powers.

After the process was complete she was kidnapped by invading forces. The forces was led by Baron Bedlam. She was later rescued by Metamorpho of the Outsiders, who hoped she could help with his cure. Dr. Jace agreed after learning Brion was not dead.

She also helped Rex Metamorpho reunite with his lost love Sapphire Stagg. However, her father Simon Stagg attacked and killed Metamorpho.

She traveled to Egypt with the Outsiders where revived Metamorpho with the meteor which first transformed him. The second exposure left Rex permanently transformed into Metamorpho and Dr. Jace no longer has the means to cure him.

Dr. Jace later helped Halo recover her lost memory using equipment from the destroyed Justice League Satellite.

During the "Millennium" storyline, it was revealed that Dr. Jace was working for the Manhunters. Using a psychic chip in Metamorpho's brain, Dr. Jace took control of him and had him attack the Outsiders. The Outsiders woke up strapped to tables in a laboratory run by Dr. Jace. After escaping from the laboratory, Looker tricked Metamorpho into attacking Dr. Jace. When Dr. Jace used a weapon on Metamorpho, it caused a surge that killed Dr. Jace and Metamorpho.

In the rebooted "DC Rebirth", Helga Jace is an astrophysicist from Markovia who is working for the Kobra organization under duress. Katana came to Markovia rescue her from Lady Eve. King Kobra interrogates Dr. Jace as Katana plans to rescue her. King Kobra later shows Dr. Jace the powers of the comatose girl that she was watching. King Kobra reveals that he caught an Aurakle as he plans to weaponize it. Before returning to the ship's command center, King Kobra leaves this task to Dr. Jace. During the Suicide Squad's fight with King Kobra's forces, Katana and Enchantress find that King Kobra had Dr. Jace fuse Violet Harper with the Aurakle as King Kobra activates the implant in Violet's neck only for Violet to tear it out as the Aurakle gains control of Violet's body. As King Kobra, Katana, and Enchantress fight Violet who is now a vessel for the Aurakles under the name of Halo, Dr. Jace flees from the battle and runs into Harley Quinn and the other Suicide Squad members as they head into the direction of the engine room. When on the ground, Dr. Jace and Prince Brion Markov witness Katana escaping with Halo.

In the Watchmen sequel Doomsday Clock, Helga Jace is among the people that reveal the Superman Theory.

In other media

Television
 Helga Jace appears in season two of Black Lightning, portrayed by Jennifer Riker. This version is an exceptional mad scientist who had been incarcerated for her illegal experiments. She is roped into helping Lynn and the A.S.A. treat metahuman children placed into stasis pods. After being re-incarcerated when some of the pod children die from the trial run of a treatment she came up with, she is freed by Todd Green, where it was revealed that she made the anti-aging serum that Tobias Whale took. Jace then takes Tobias to where the remaining pod children are. In the episode "The Book of the Apocalypse: Chapter One: The Alpha", Jace assists Tobias and Giselle Cutter in releasing Shakedown's fellow prisoners New Wave, Heatstroke, and Coldsnap from their pods. While tending to Shakedown after Cutter attacked him, she later speaks to Tobias about Cutter being unstable, only for him to dismiss it. Cutter informs the two of them of former minion, Lala's attack, causing Tobias and Cutter to escape in their car while Jace contacts New Wave to get the Masters of Disaster to the rendezvous. In "The Book of the Apocalypse: The Omega", Helga Jace tries to ambush Black Lightning where Tobias kept the pods only for her to be beaten into submission by Lynn Stewart. To evade being handed over to the A.S.A., Jace gives Black Lightning and Lynn the information they need. Jace is then handed over to Deputy Chief Henderson. While in police custody, the teleporter Instant shows up at the Freeland Police Department and shoots the police officers guarding her. When Jace notes the teleportation ability, Instant reveals that he is a bounty hunter who was contracted by the Markovians to reclaim Jace. Instant then teleports away with Jace in his clutches. In season three, Helga Jace is in the Markovians' possession working to stabilize the metahumans in their possession until she is extracted during Black Lightning's mission to rescue Lynn. She does reveal to Brandon that his father has earth-based powers and was the one who killed his mother even when he has her bound in his apartment. In the season three finale during the Markovian's invasion of Freeland, Commander Carson Williams breaks into Brandon's apartment and kills Dr. Jace as part of his orders to remove classified information.
 Helga Jace appears in Young Justice, voiced by Grey DeLisle. She starts out as the personal physician to Markovia's royal family until she became a seemingly-unwilling participant in a metahuman trafficking ring, who also kidnapped Terra after she had tested positive for the meta-gene. After Prince Brion was banished, the Outsiders allowed her to come with them to the USA so she can watch over the young prince as well as Violet Harper/Halo. Helga has also entered a relationship with Jefferson Pierce/Black Lightning. Similarly to the comics, she was responsible for giving Brion and Princess Tara their varied geokinetic powers; in fact, she coined Brion's codename of "Geo-Force" in reference to said powers. However, it is implied that she may have an agenda of her own, expressing interest in helping Victor Stone/Cyborg learn to cope with and perfect his robot components with her expertise. She manages to convince her superhero lover, Jeff, that she cannot do so without a laboratory of her own; feeling that it is the least she could do to repay everyone's kindness to her. On the other hand, she was unaware that Tara was recording the conversation for Deathstroke. She is indeed seen to be studying Violet's D.N.A. and the spirit of the destroyed Mother Box within her. In "Illusion of Control", she expresses her gratitude at being included in her first Thanksgiving in America, enjoying the feast provided by Artemis. She then informs the paraplegic Paula that Artemis has deeply impressed her with mentoring Halo, Tara, and Geo-Force as Tigress; unaware of Paula's strong opposition to her youngest daughter returning to crime-fighting. During the second half of the season, she has been seen contacting a mysterious "mentor" (who is later revealed in the episode "Unknown Factors" to be Ultra-Humanite). In "Antisocial Pathologies", Jace is further revealed to have been willingly working for the Light all this time. She had activated the metagenes for both Tara and Brion, considering them to be her children, while euthanizing Gabrielle when she had tested negative for the metagene. It also turned out that the relationship between her and Black Lightning was a lie, as she was only using him to get what she wanted. In "Nevermore", she becomes Brion's advisor when he becomes the new ruler of Markovia. Jace returns in Young Justice: Phantoms.

References

External links
 Helga Jace at DC Comics Wiki
 Helga Jace at Comic Vine

DC Comics female characters
Fictional geneticists
Fictional physicians
Comics characters introduced in 1983
Characters created by Mike W. Barr
Characters created by Jim Aparo
DC Comics scientists